PEGI or Pan-European Game Information is a European video game content rating system established to help European consumers make informed decisions when buying video games or apps through the use of age recommendations and content descriptors. It was developed by the Interactive Software Federation of Europe (ISFE) and came into use in April 2003, replacing many national age rating systems with a single European system. The PEGI system is now used in 41 countries and is based on a code of conduct, a set of rules to which every publisher using the PEGI system is contractually committed. PEGI self-regulation is composed by five age categories and nine content descriptors that advise the suitability of a game for a certain age range based on the game's content. The age rating is not intended to indicate the difficulty of the game or the skill required to play it.

Age ratings 
PEGI has five age categories.

Black and white icons were used until June 2009, with new colour-coded icons: with green for 3 and 7, orange for 12 and 16, and red for 18. Plus signs were removed from the icons, and the background wallpaper now says "PEGI" as opposed to "ISFE". That design was slightly altered at the start of 2010, by removing the watermark and locking the URL bar underneath the age rating icon. Reprinted games from 2010 or before often still display the old designs.

In Portugal, two of the PEGI categories were originally aligned with the age ratings of the film classification system to avoid confusion: 3 was changed to 4 and 7 was changed to 6. Finland also used a modified scale, where 12 became 11 and 16 became 15. Finland fully adopted PEGI on 1 January 2007, and the standard ratings were fully enforced as well. Portugal fully adopted PEGI on 1 February 2021, and the standard ratings were also fully enforced.

Content descriptions 
In addition to the above ratings, PEGI also uses eight content descriptors (nine if Fear and Horror are counted separately):

Current

Former

Statistics 
As of December 2015, PEGI has rated more than 25,300 games. 42.2% of these games were rated 3, 15.8% rated 7, 22.3% rated 12, 12.7% rated 16 and only 7% were rated 18.

Of all the games that were rated in 2015 (1855 games in total):
 64.7% (1201) have the Violence content descriptor.
 25.4% (472) have the Online content descriptor.
 18.4% (341) have the Bad Language content descriptor.
 7.7% (142) have the Fear content descriptor.
 8.0% (90) have the Sex content descriptor.
 1.4% (26) have the Gambling content descriptor.
 1.2% (23) have the Drugs content descriptor.
 0.1% (5) games have the Discrimination content descriptor.

PEGI and the European Union 
A consumer survey commissioned by ISFE in 2012 demonstrated that the PEGI age rating labels are recognised on average by 51% of respondents in 16 countries (highest: France 72%; lowest: Czechia 28%), while 86% of all respondents found them to be clear and 89% found them useful.

PEGI is an example of European harmonization. The European Commission supports the PEGI self-regulation: "PEGI appears to have achieved good results and PEGI On-line is also a promising initiative, making of PEGI a good example of self-regulation in line with the better regulation agenda."
Moreover, the European Parliament in its last report on the protection of consumers "takes the view that the PEGI system for rating games is an important tool which has improved transparency for consumers, especially parents, when buying games by enabling them to make a considered choice as to whether a game is suitable for children".

Rating process 
To obtain the ratings for any piece of interactive software, the applicant submits the game with other supporting materials and completes a content declaration, all of which is evaluated by an independent administrator called the Netherlands Institute for the Classification of Audiovisual Media (NICAM). It is based on the Dutch Kijkwijzer system as well.
Following the evaluation the applicant will receive a license to use the rating logos. If the applicant disagrees with the rating, they can ask for an explanation or make a complaint to the complaints board. Consumers may also make complaints to this board.

Although PEGI was established by an industry body (ISFE) the ratings are given by a body independent of the industry and the whole system is overseen by a number of different Boards and Committees. There is the PEGI Council, composed mainly by national representatives for PEGI, that recommends adjustments to the code in light of social, legal and technological developments. Members of the PEGI Council are recruited for their skill and experience from among parent/consumer body representatives, child psychologists, media specialists, civil servants, academics and legal advisers versed in the protection of minors in Europe.

There is also a Complaints Board with experts from various European countries. They deal with complaints related to breaches of requirements of the code of conduct or to age rating recommendations. Should a complaint be received from a consumer or publisher regarding a rating given to a game and no satisfactory settlement can be reached by the PEGI administrator through discussion, explanation or negotiation the complainant may formally request the Complaints Board to mediate. Three board members will then convene, hear the complaint and decide on a ruling. Publishers using the PEGI system are bound by the decision of the Complaints Board. Consequently, they are obliged to carry out any corrective actions required and, in cases of non-compliance, are subject to sanctions as laid out by the code.

Global cooperation in IARC 
In 2013, PEGI co-founded the International Age Rating Coalition with USK and the ESRB. IARC aims to streamline the rating of digitally distributed games and apps by providing a single online system that produces age ratings for all participating regions. By filling out one questionnaire, a publisher instantaneously receives ratings from PEGI, USK, ESRB, ACB and others.

PEGI committees 
There are a number of committees to ensure the system keeps functioning properly.

 Experts Group: The PEGI Experts Group is made up of academics working in the fields of psychology and sociology, and representatives from NICAM, VSC, and the games industry. It works on adapting and modifying the PEGI questionnaire and the underlying criteria to take account of technological and content developments and recommendations made by the PEGI Council or circumstances brought to light by the complaints procedure.
 Legal Committee: Since PEGI is a voluntary system it runs in conjunction with, and is subordinate to, existing national laws, whether they prohibit certain content or establish mandatory rating systems. The Legal Committee's role is to advise PEGI s.a. of any changes to national legislation within participating countries that could affect the voluntary age rating system.
 Enforcement Committee: The Enforcement Committee is charged with implementing the recommendations of the PEGI Council and, more generally, of ensuring the enforcement of the provisions of the PEGI Code of Conduct, including conclusion of the Complaints Board.

PEGI Online 
In 2007, the PEGI Online division of PEGI was formed as an addition to the PEGI system for online games. Goals include giving young people in Europe improved protection against unsuitable online gaming content and educating parents on how to ensure safe online play. This project is supported directly by the European Commission:

PEGI Online is based on four principles:
 The PEGI Online Safety Code and Framework Contract which is signed by all participants
 The PEGI Online Logo which will be displayed by holders of a licence
 The website for applicants and for the general public
 An independent administration, advice, and dispute settlement process

The licence to display the PEGI Online Logo is granted by the PEGI Online Administrator to any online gameplay service provider that meets the requirements set out in the PEGI Online Safety Code (POSC).

Usage 

PEGI is the standard age rating system for video games in 40 European countries alongside Israel, but products with PEGI labels can be found across the globe alongside other rating systems as a result of import for linguistic reasons (e.g.: English versions in India, South Africa and the United Arab Emirates, Spanish or Portuguese versions in Latin America). The official status of PEGI ratings varies from country to country, depending on the way national legislation deals with age classification and the protection of minors. In some countries, PEGI is the de facto standard without specific regulation, other countries have officially acknowledged PEGI as the sole system for age ratings, while yet another number of countries have incorporated the PEGI rating system into laws governing the age classification of media, making the labels enforceable in retail.

Officially supports PEGI

Other countries

Reception

Portrayals of gambling 
Games containing minigames resembling casino games and gambling may be subject to heightened ratings due to "12" being the minimum for the "Gambling" descriptor. A 2016 re-release of Pokémon Red and Blue for Nintendo 3DS received a "12" rating (despite receiving the "E" rating from the U.S.-based ESRB) due to its "Game Corner" feature, which includes slot machines that can be played with in-game cash to earn coins redeemable for items. The European release of Pokémon Platinum (2009) was modified to remove the slot machines and replace them with non-interactive "game machines".

In 2019, the basketball video game NBA 2K20 received criticism for a trailer, focused on its "MyTeam" mode, which depicted chance-based minigames styled after casino games such as roulette, slots and pachinko. The visuals were considered to be sensitive due to increasing controversy over use of "loot box" mechanics in video games. After receiving an e-mail expressing concern over the trailer, PEGI clarified in response that the "Gambling" descriptor applies only to games that "teach" and "encourage" gambling, although admitting that the trailer's imagery may have been "too close for comfort" for some viewers, and that PEGI did not base its ratings decisions on singular trailers.

See also 
 ESRB

Notes

References

External links 
 
 ISFE website

European integration
Information technology organizations based in Europe
Organizations established in 2003
Game Information
Video game content ratings systems
Entertainment rating organizations
2003 establishments in Europe